The Los Banos Enterprise is a newspaper that serves the city of Los Banos, California. The paper is printed bi-weekly and has a circulation of 16,000 copies.

The paper was purchased by The McClatchy Company in 2003.
On May 27, 2022 the newspaper was reintroduced under new ownership, Los Banos Enterprise, LLC is acting publisher and editor in chief.

History 
Los Banos Enterprise was founded in 1891 by P.H. Higgins. The paper was later owned by Carlos O. Freeman.  In 1902, the paper was owned by Willard Beebe. In 1902, the paper advocated for Merced County to be split and for a new county to be formed. 

In 1905, the Enterprise was merged with the Los Banos Advance, and the papers retained the name Los Banos Enterprise. Beebe died in 1905 from erisypelas. Bert A. Wilson became owner of the Enterprise at that time.

In 1915, Enterprise owner Bert A. Wilson became Post Master of Los Banos. Needing to commit attention to his new post, Wilson leased the Enterprise to M.P. Lewis, who had been a foreman in the mechanical department of the paper. W.S. Walker became editor of the paper at that time. Wilson later ran for the California Assembly. Wilson retained ownership of the paper until 1944, when he sold the paper to Frank Merrick, who had worked at the paper since 1928.

Frank Merrick was editor and publisher of the paper until 1963. William J. Brehm Sr. of Brehm Communications Inc. purchased the paper in 1962. In 1963, Joseph Knebel was named publisher. Knebel also published the Gustine Standard.

In 2003, McClatchy purchased the Enterprise, along with the Merced Sun-Star and four other non-dailies, from Pacific Sierra Publishing Company. On May 27, 2022 the newspaper was announced under new ownership.

Awards

California Newspaper Publishers Association Better Newspaper Contest

Fresno State Gruner Awards

References

Newspapers published in California